Eurovision 2009 could refer to:
 Eurovision Song Contest 2009, the fifty-fourth Eurovision Song Contest, that was held in May 2009
 Junior Eurovision Song Contest 2009, the seventh Junior Eurovision Song Contest, that was held in November 2009
 Third Eurovision Dance Contest, which was originally due to be held in 2009